The High Bridge (originally the Aqueduct Bridge) is the oldest bridge in New York City, having originally opened as part of the Croton Aqueduct in 1848 and reopened as a pedestrian walkway in 2015 after being closed for over 45 years. The eastern end is located in the Highbridge section of the Bronx near the western end of West 170th Street, and the western end is located in Highbridge Park in Manhattan, roughly parallel to the end of West 174th Street.

High Bridge was originally completed in 1848 with 16 individual stone arches. In 1928, the five that spanned the Harlem River were replaced by a single  steel arch. The bridge was closed to all traffic from around 1970 until its restoration, which began in 2009. The bridge was reopened to pedestrians and bicycles on June 9, 2015.

The bridge is operated and maintained by the New York City Department of Parks and Recreation.

Construction and history

Construction 

Originally designed as a stone arch bridge, the High Bridge had the appearance of a Roman aqueduct. The design of the bridge was originally awarded to Major David Bates Douglass, who was fired from the project. The design then fell to the aqueduct's engineering team, led by John B. Jervis. James Renwick, Jr., who later went on to design the landmark Saint Patrick's Cathedral on Fifth Avenue in Midtown Manhattan, participated in the design.

The Croton Aqueduct had to cross the Harlem River at some point, and the method was a major design decision. A tunnel under the river was considered, but tunneling technology was in its infancy at the time, and the uncertainty of pursuing this option led to its rejection. This left a bridge, with the Water Commission, engineers and the public split between a low bridge and a high bridge. A low bridge would have been simpler, faster, and cheaper to construct. When concerns were raised to the New York Legislature that a low bridge would obstruct passage along the Harlem River to the Hudson River, a high bridge was ultimately chosen.

The contractors for the project were George Law, Samuel Roberts and Arnold Mason. Mason had prior engineering experience working on the Erie Canal and the Morris Canal.

Usage 
In 1864, a walkway was built across the High Bridge. The New York City Department of Parks and Recreation (NYC Parks), the bridge's current maintainer, described the walkway as the bridge's contemporary High Line. However, the bridge was not used for vehicles.

Of the masonry arches of the original 1848 bridge, only one survives on the Manhattan side, while nine survive on the Bronx side.

Use of the structure to deliver water to Manhattan ceased on December 15, 1949.

By 1954, The New York Times reported that the commissioner of the Department of Water Supply, Gas and Electricity said that "the bridge entailed serious problems of maintenance and vandalism." Robert Moses agreed to take responsibility for the bridge, which was transferred to the Parks Department in 1955. There were incidents, in 1957 and 1958, of pedestrians throwing sticks, stones, and bricks from the bridge, seriously injuring passengers on Circle Line tour boats which passed under the bridge. Concerns due to these incidents supposedly contributed to the bridge being closed as early as 1960, although NYC Parks said that it was not closed until 1970, when high crime and fiscal crisis led to the contraction of many city services and public spaces. However, a reporter for The New York Times wrote that when he had tried to walk across the bridge in 1968, it was closed. The New York City Landmarks Preservation Commission (LPC) designated the High Bridge as a city landmark on November 15, 1970.

Aqueduct
The High Bridge was part of the first reliable and plentiful water supply system in New York City. As the City was devastated by cholera in 1832 and the Great Fire in 1835, the inadequacy of the water system of wells-and-cisterns became apparent. Numerous corrective measures were examined. In the final analysis, only the Croton River in northern Westchester County was found to carry water sufficient in quantity and quality to serve the City. The delivery system was begun in 1837, and was completed in 1848.

The Old Croton Aqueduct was the first of its kind ever constructed in the United States. University Avenue was later built over the southernmost mainland portion of the aqueduct, leading to the bridge. Though the carrying capacity was enlarged in 1861–1862 with a larger tube, the bridge became obsolete in 1910 with the opening of the New Croton Aqueduct. In the 1920s, the bridge's masonry arches were declared a hazard to ship navigation by the United States Army Corps of Engineers, and the City considered demolishing the entire structure. Local organizations called to preserve the historic bridge, and, in 1927, five of the original arches across the river were replaced by a single steel span, while the remaining arches were retained.

Restoration 

In November 2006, the Department of Parks and Recreation announced that the bridge would reopen to pedestrians in 2009. This date was repeatedly put off. A $20 million renovation project would include strengthening the arch, improving staircases, cameras on both ends of the bridge, and boat beacon lights among other features.

In 2009, preliminary planning, funded by PlaNYC, began for restoring the High Bridge. In early 2010, a contract was signed with Lichtenstein Consulting Engineers and Chu & Gassman Consulting Engineers (MEP sub-consultant) to provide designs for the restored bridge.

On January 11, 2013, the mayor's office announced the bridge would reopen for pedestrian traffic by 2014, but in August 2014, the open was postponed to spring of 2015. In May 2015, the Parks Department announced a July opening and a July 25 festival. The ribbon was cut for the restored bridge at about 11:30 a.m. on June 9, 2015, with the bridge open to the general public at noon. The High Bridge was illuminated at night following its restoration.

High Bridge Water Tower

The High Bridge Water Tower, in Highbridge Park between West 173rd and 174th streets, on top of the ridge on the Manhattan side of High Bridge, was built in 1866–1872 to help meet the ever-increasing demands on the city's water system. The  octagonal tower, which was authorized by the State Legislature in 1863, was designed by John B. Jervis, the engineer who supervised the building of the High Bridge Aqueduct. Water was pumped up  to a  reservoir next to the tower – now the site of a play center and public pool built in 1934–1936 – which then provided water to be lifted to the tower's  tank. This "high service" improved the water system's gravity pressure, necessary because of the increased use of flush toilets.

The High Bridge system reached its full capacity by 1875. With the opening of the New Croton Aqueduct in 1890, the High Bridge system became less relied upon; during World War I, it was completely shut down when sabotage was feared. In 1949, the tower was removed from service, and a carillon, donated by the Altman Foundation, was installed in 1958.

The tower's cupola was damaged by an arson fire in 1984. It was reconstructed, and the tower's load-bearing exterior stonework – which Jervis designed in a mixture of Romanesque Revival and neo-Grec styles – was cleaned and restored in 1989–1990 by the William A. Hall Partnership. Christopher Gray has said of the tower's design that "Its rock-faced granite gives the tower a chunky, fortified appearance, as if it were a lookout for a much larger castle complex that was never built.... The granite is competently handled, but the details are not very inspired or elegant. The tower is more picturesque than beautiful."

The interior of the tower, which was never open to the public, features a wide well-detailed iron spiral staircase with six large landings and paired windows.

The High Bridge Water Tower was designated a New York City landmark by the Landmarks Preservation Commission in 1967.  The High Bridge Water Tower underwent a 10-year, $5 million renovation during the 2010s and reopened to the public in November 2021. After the water tower reopened, NYC Parks began hosting free tours of the structure.

Gallery

See also
Highbridge Reservoir
 List of bridges documented by the Historic American Engineering Record in New York (state)
 List of New York City Designated Landmarks in Manhattan above 110th Street
 List of New York City Designated Landmarks in the Bronx
 National Register of Historic Places listings in Manhattan above 110th Street
 National Register of Historic Places listings in the Bronx

References
Notes

External links 

Friends of the Old Croton Aqueduct
New York City Department of Parks: High Bridge
High Bridge Park Development Association
NYCRoads.com: High Bridge (Aqueduct Bridge)
thehighbridge.org
2004 article about restoration plans
High Bridge Documentary produced by The City Concealed

bridgesnyc: High Bridge
Highbridge Historic Structure Report

1848 establishments in New York (state)
Brick bridges in the United States
Bridges completed in 1848
Bridges in Manhattan
Bridges in the Bronx
Bridges on the National Register of Historic Places in New York (state)
Bridges on the National Register of Historic Places in New York City
Bridges on the National Register of Historic Places
Bridges over the Harlem River
Buildings and structures on the National Register of Historic Places in Manhattan
Deck arch bridges in the United States
Highbridge, Bronx
Historic American Engineering Record in New York City
National Register of Historic Places in the Bronx
New York City Designated Landmarks in Manhattan
New York City Designated Landmarks in the Bronx
Open-spandrel deck arch bridges in the United States
Pedestrian bridges in New York City
Steel bridges in the United States
Washington Heights, Manhattan
Bridge light displays